Nicole Lisa Gaelebale (born April 22, 1993) is a Botswana beauty queen. She was crowned Miss Global Botswana 2012. She represented Botswana at Miss Earth 2014. In 2015, she won second place and was crowned First Princess of Botswana. She also won Miss World Botswana 2017 and represented Botswana at Miss World 2017.

References

External links
 
 Miss Earth's official website

1993 births
Miss Earth 2014 contestants
Botswana beauty pageant winners
Miss World 2017 delegates
Living people